Here It 'Tis is an album by jazz organist Johnny "Hammond" Smith recorded for the Prestige label in 1970.

Reception

The Allmusic site awarded the album 4 stars.

Track listing
All compositions by Johnny "Hammond" Smith and James Clark except where noted
 "Here It 'Tis" – 4:40   
 "Stormy" (J. R. Cobb, Buddy Buie) – 4:00   
 "The Nubs" (Smith) – 9:40   
 "Gina D" – 7:05   
 "Danny Boy" (Frederic Weatherly) – 4:15   
 "You've Made Me So Very Happy" (Berry Gordy, Jr., Brenda Holloway, Patrice Holloway, Frank Wilson) 8:00

Personnel
Johnny "Hammond" Smith - organ
Houston Person - tenor saxophone
James Clark - guitar
Jimmy Lewis - electric bass
Bernard Purdie (tracks 1 & 3-5) Eddie Gee (tracks 2 & 6) - drums

Production
 Bob Porter - producer
 Rudy Van Gelder - engineer

References

Johnny "Hammond" Smith albums
1970 albums
Prestige Records albums
Albums produced by Bob Porter (record producer)
Albums recorded at Van Gelder Studio